The history of the Portuguese Communist Party (or PCP), spans a period of  years, since its foundation in 1921 as the Portuguese section of the Communist International (Comintern) to the present. The Party is still an active force within Portuguese society.

After its foundation, the party experienced little time as a legal party before it was forced underground after a military coup in 1926. After some years of internal re-organization, that adapted the PCP to its new clandestine condition and enlarged its base of support, the party became a force in the opposition to the dictatorial regime led by António de Oliveira Salazar, despite being brutally suppressed several times during the 48 years of resistance and having spent several years with little connection with the Comintern and the World Communist Movement.

After the end of the dictatorship, with the Carnation Revolution in 1974, the party became a major political force within the new democratic regime, mainly among the working class. Despite being less influential since the fall of the Socialist bloc in eastern Europe, it still enjoys popularity in vast sectors of Portuguese society, particularly in the rural areas of the Alentejo and Ribatejo, and also in the heavily industrialized areas around Lisbon and Setúbal, where it holds the leadership of some municipalities.

Origins and foundation

At the end of World War I, in 1918, Portugal fell into a serious economic crisis, in part due to the Portuguese military intervention in the war. The military involvement led to an abrupt rise in inflation and unemployment. The Portuguese working classes responded to the deterioration in their living standards with a vast wave of strikes. Supported by an emerging labour movement, the workers achieved some of their objectives, such as the historic victory of an eight-hour working day.

In September 1919, the working class movement founded the first Portuguese Labour Union Confederation, the General Confederation of Labour (CGT) that saw a steady increase to 100,000 members in few months. But the feeling of political powerlessness, due to the lack of a coherent political strategy among the Portuguese working class, plus the growing popularity of the Bolshevik revolution in Russia in 1917, led to the foundation of the Portuguese Maximalist Federation (FMP) in 1919. The goal of FMP was to promote socialist and revolutionary ideas and to organize and develop the worker movement. The FMP started publishing the weekly Bandeira Vermelha (Red Flag) which became a popular newspaper among the Portuguese working classes.

After some time, members of the FMP started to feel the need for a "revolutionary vanguard" among Portuguese workers. After several meetings at various Labor Union offices, and with the aid of the Comintern, this desire culminated in the foundation of the Portuguese Communist Party as the Portuguese Section of the Communist International (Comintern), on 6 March 1921. Soon after, the party's first youth organization, the Communist Youths (Portuguese: Juventudes Comunistas) was created.

Unlike virtually all other European Communist Parties, the PCP was not formed after a split of a Social Democratic or Socialist Party, but from the ranks of Anarcho-Syndicalism and revolutionary syndicalism. Both of these groups, at the time, were the most active factions of the Portuguese labor movement. The Party opened its first headquarters in the Arco do Marquês do Alegrete Street in Lisbon. In the same year, 1921, it also opened the Communist Centers of Porto, Évora, and Beja. Seven months after its creation, the first issue of O Comunista (The Communist), the first newspaper of the party, was published.

The first congress of the party took place in Lisbon in November 1923, with Carlos Rates leading the party. The theses of the congress had previously been published in O Comunista and discussed by all the local organizations. The congress was attended by about a hundred members of the party and asserted its solidarity with Socialism in the Soviet Union and the need for a strong struggle for similar policies in Portugal; it also stated that a Fascist uprising in Portugal was a serious threat to the party and to the country.

Outlawing and the clandestine struggle

From the 1926 military coup to the Reorganization of 40
After the military coup of May 28, 1926, the party was outlawed, and had to operate in secrecy. By coincidence, the coup was carried out on the eve of the second congress, forcing the suspension of the tasks. In 1927 the party's Main Office was closed. The party was first re-organized in 1929 under Bento Gonçalves. Adapting the party to its new illegal status, the re-organization created a net of clandestine cells to avoid a wave of detentions.

The re-organization of 1929 made the party more effective and influential, especially among the labour movement. However, with the rise of Salazar's dictatorial Estado Novo regime, in 1933, suppression of the party grew. The strikes and the creation of new labour unions were made illegal in September 1933 with the existing unions being forced to adopt the new corporativist rules. This would greatly limit the party's pull among the working classes. This, along with ideological struggles between Marxist and anarcho-syndicalist factions and the conflicts with the Comintern, would lead to a new decline in the party's action in the late 1930s. Meanwhile, in 1931, the first number of Avante! was published. Despite its illegal status, the newspaper would become the most important publication of the party, being distributed among clandestine members. However, due to the constant assaults of the clandestine printing offices, the newspaper would not become widely available until the 1940s.

Despite the growing repression against the communists, that included the obligation of all civil servant to sign an anticommunist statement, the party still managed to influence riots and demonstrations. In 1934, following the closure of the free labour unions, several riots and strikes started, the most notable of them in Marinha Grande. There, on January 18, the workers, led by José Gregório, António Guerra and other Party members, controlled the entire town and only a massive intervention by the military would end the riot. In 1936, the party's influence inside the navy led to a mutiny in several ships, 10 of them were killed and another 60 were sent to Tarrafal.

Also in 1936, the Spanish Civil War began. Despite some appeals from the Communist Party of Spain and the Comintern for the members of the party to enlist, the fragilized structure of the late 1930s never allowed it to send a reasonable force. Nonetheless, an estimated 1,000 Portuguese fought against the Francoist forces, integrated the Republican ranks.

In the late 1930s, many members were arrested, tortured, and executed. Many were sent to the Tarrafal concentration camp in the Cape Verde Islands. This included Bento Gonçalves, who died there. The vast wave of arrests in the previous years led to the announcement of the definitive end of the PCP by the government, which, along with a growing confidence in the German victory in World War II, led to the liberation of several communist prisoners from Tarrafal and other prisons in November 1940, among them, Álvaro Cunhal, Militão Ribeiro and Júlio Fogaça. The release of important cadres, combined with the internal dissatisfaction about the decline of the party influenced a major re-organization in 1940–41, named the Reorganization of 40.

Meanwhile, in 1938, the Portuguese Communist Party had been expelled from the Communist International. The reason for the expulsion was a sense of distrust inside the Comintern, caused by a sudden breakdown in the party's activity, accusations of alleged embezzlement of money carried out by some important members of the party and, mainly, the weak internal structure of the Party, dominated by internal wars. The action against the PCP, signed by Georgi Dimitrov, was in part taken due to some persecution against Comintern member parties or persons (like the Communist Party of Poland or Béla Kun) led by Joseph Stalin. These series of events would, in part, lead to the end of the Comintern in 1943. The PCP would only re-establish its relations with the Communist movement and the Soviet Union in 1947, after some sporadic contacts made, at first, through the Communist parties of Spain and France and later through Mikhail Suslov.

The 3rd congress (the first one after the re-organization) was held in 1943, and stated that the party should unite with all those who also wanted the end of the dictatorship. Another important conclusion was the need to increase the party's influence inside the Portuguese army. For the first time ever, the party was able to build a strong clandestine organization, with a net of clandestine cadres, which would make the party the foundation of the Portuguese resistance against the regime. These improvements in the party's structure led to the creation of the first national platform of democratic organizations, the Movement of National Antifascist Unity (MUNAF), in December 1943. In 1944, the Portuguese support of the German war effort created severe shortages of food and goods, greatly decreasing Portugal's living standards. The situation led to waves of strikes, greatly influenced by the party, in the regions of Lisbon, Ribatejo and Alentejo. By this time, with the re-organized structure successfully avoiding the persecutions, the Avante! was being published at least once per month, stating the party's support to the popular turmoil.

Post-war and the Movement of Democratic Unity
In 1945, with a whole new international community created by the defeat of the major fascist regimes in World War II, Salazar was forced to make some superficial democratic changes in order to raise Portugal's image in the eyes of its western allies. In October of that year, the democratic resistance was authorized to form a platform, which was named Movement of Democratic Unity (Portuguese: Movimento de Unidade Democrática, or MUD). Initially, the MUD was controlled by the moderate opposition, but soon became strongly influenced by the PCP that controlled its youth wing. Among the leadership of the youth wing were several communists, including Octávio Pato, Salgado Zenha, Mário Soares, Júlio Pomar and Mário Sacramento. This influence led to the MUD being made illegal by the government in 1948, after several waves of suppression.

The fourth congress, held in July 1946, pointed to massive popular struggle as the only way to overthrow the regime, and stated the policies that would help the party lead that popular movement. This, along with the improvement of the party's clandestine action, was the main focus of the congress. A brief report of the conclusions of this congress was published by the Central Committee of the Communist Party of the Soviet Union (CPSU). For the first time since the party had been expelled from the Comintern, the CPSU published info about the PCP, a slight change in the Soviet stance on the party. At this time, Álvaro Cunhal travelled to Yugoslavia with the aid of Bento de Jesus Caraça in order to improve the relations with the Socialist Bloc. Later, in 1948, he travelled to Soviet Union in order to speak with Mikhail Suslov, after the ties between the PCP and the International Communist Movement were re-established. Soon after returning from Soviet Union, Cunhal was arrested by the political police.

In 1951, after the death of the president António Carmona, the government, continuing the policy of staging democratic changes, called for an election. The Party, along with other sectors of the opposition, supported the mathematician Ruy Luís Gomes, who would be declared ineligible five days before the election. During the campaign, some supporters of his candidacy had been imprisoned and Gomes himself had been beaten in the Rio Tinto. Following these events, the other oppositionist candidate, Quintão Meireles, abandoned the elections and the official candidate, Craveiro Lopes, was elected unchallenged.

Portuguese Colonial War and last years of the regime

In 1954, a harvest-worker named Catarina Eufémia was murdered by a lieutenant of the Guarda Nacional Republicana after attempting to ask her supervisor for a pay raise. Catarina became a martyr of the party's struggle for better living conditions for the peasants in Alentejo. After the Carnation Revolution, the Party erected a monument to Catarina in her hometown, Baleizão.

The fifth congress, held in September 1957, was the first and the only to be held outside Portugal. In Kyiv, Soviet Union, the Party approved its first program and statutes, revealing an increase of the Party's organic stability. The congress took, for the first time, an official position on colonialism, stating that all people had the right to self-determination, and made clear its support of the liberation movements in the Portuguese colonies, such as MPLA in Angola, FRELIMO in Mozambique and PAIGC in Guinea-Bissau. This was the first congress in the party's history to receive salutations from foreign communist parties.

In 1958, the government announced that a presidential election would be held; however, as in the previous elections, the opposition groups had little trust in the fairness of the electoral act. The candidate supported by the party, Arlindo Vicente, left the race and supported Humberto Delgado, who was gathering support from several democratic groups. Despite a massive campaign with a major rally in Porto, attended by 200,000 people, the government's candidate, Américo Tomás, won the election through massive election fraud. Delgado would later be assassinated by the PIDE.

In January 1960, a remarkable event in the party's history occurred: A group of ten PCP members managed to escape from the high-security prison in Peniche. The escape returned to freedom many top figures of the party, among them, Álvaro Cunhal, who would be elected in the following year the first Secretary-general in nineteen years. Among the escapees was also Jaime Serra, who would help to organize a secret commando group, the Armed Revolutionary Action (Portuguese: Acção Revolucionária Armada or ARA.) The ARA was the armed branch of the PCP that would be responsible in the early 1970s for some military action against the dictatorial regime.

In 1961, the Colonial War in Africa began, first in Angola, and in the next year in Mozambique and Guinea-Bissau. The war lasted 13 years and devastated Portuguese society, forcing many thousands of Portuguese citizens, mainly young people, to leave the country seeking a better future in countries like France, Germany or Switzerland, and also to escape conscription. The Party, which had been involved in the formation of the nationalist guerrilla movements along with the Soviet Union, immediately stated its opposition to the war, and political support of the anti-colonial movements. The war initiated a process of decline of the regime as it caused a growing unrest inside Portuguese society.

In 1962, the "Academic Crisis" occurred. The Portuguese regime, fearing the growing popularity of democratic ideas among the students, carried out the boycott and censure of several student associations and organizations, including the important National Secretariat of Portuguese Students. Most members of this organization were intellectual communist militants that were persecuted and forbidden to continue their university studies. The students, with strong aid from the PCP, responded with demonstrations that culminated on 24 March with a huge student demonstration in Lisbon. The demonstration was brutally suppressed by the shock police, leading to hundreds of student injuries. Immediately thereafter, the students began a strike that became an important point in the resistance against the regime. In 1987, the 24th of March was declared the National Day of the Students by the Portuguese parliament, which is celebrated every year, mainly by university students.

The sixth congress in 1965 became one of the most important congresses in the party's history. Álvaro Cunhal, elected General-secretary in 1961, released the report The Path to Victory—The tasks of the Party in the National and Democratic Revolution which became a document of major influence within the democratic movement. Widely distributed among the clandestine members, it contained eight political goals, such as "the end of the monopolies in the economy," "the need for agrarian reform and redistribution of the land," and "the democratization of access to culture and education" — policies that the party considered essential to make Portugal a fully democratic country. By this time, the Sino-Soviet split and the criticisms of Maoism made during the congress caused the Maoist members to leave the party.

In 1970, the Armed Revolutionary Action made its first attack, sabotaging the Cunene, a ship used to transport supplies for the troops in Africa. The ARA would keep attacking political and military targets of the regime until August 1972. Some of its major attacks included an attack to the school of the political police, the PIDE, the bombing of the Niassa ship, the destruction of several war helicopters in the Tancos air base, the bombing of the cultural center of the United States embassy and an attack to the regional NATO command in Oeiras.

In 1972, the Communist Students League, the first organized youth wing in several years, was founded. It would later become the Portuguese Communist Youth.

Following several years of turmoil, due to the prolonged war and by the growing unrest caused by the lack of liberties, the regime fell. On 25 April 1974, the Carnation Revolution occurred, putting an end to 48 years of resistance and marking the beginning of a new cycle in the party's life.

Carnation Revolution of 1974 and the first years of democracy

Revolutionary period

Immediately after the revolution, basic democratic rights were re-established in Portugal. On 27 April, the political prisoners were freed, including a large number of imprisoned Party cadres. On April 30, Álvaro Cunhal returned to Lisbon, where he was received by thousands of people. May 1 was commemorated for the first time in 48 years, and an estimated half million people gathered in the FNAT Stadium (now May 1 Stadium) in Lisbon to hear the speeches of the party's leader Álvaro Cunhal and the socialist Mário Soares. On May 17, the party's newspaper, Avante!, produced the first legal issue of its history.

The following months were marked by radical changes in the country, always closely followed and supported by the PCP. Several parties were created. The major political and military leaders for the former regime were exiled or dismissed. A process to give independence to the colonies started with the full support of the party and, within one year, Guinea-Bissau, Angola, Mozambique, Cape Verde and São Tomé and Príncipe would become independent countries. By that time, the party was holding several rallies per week. A good part of the party's political proposals were being met. A major struggle of the party was assuring the unity of all labour unions inside the General Confederation of the Portuguese Workers, which was opposed by the Socialists and the Social Democrats. The Party also criticized the growing interference by NATO in the revolutionary process, which was supported by the Socialists and by the right-wing.

Six months after the Revolution, in October 1974, the party's seventh congress took place. More than a thousand delegates and hundreds of Portuguese and foreign guests attended. The congress set forth important statements that discussed the ongoing revolution in the country. The 36 members of the elected Central Committee had spent more than 300 years in jail.

On 12 January 1975, the Portuguese Communist Party became the first legally recognized party, after the opening of the legalizing process by the Supreme Court of Justice. Meanwhile, the revolutionary process continued. On 11 March 1975, the left-wing military forces defeated a coup attempt perpetrated by the right wing military connected to the former regime. This resulted in a turn of the revolutionary process to the political left, with the main sectors of the economy, such as the banks, transportation, steel mills, mines and communications companies, being nationalized. This was done under the lead of Vasco Gonçalves, a member of the military wing who supported the party and who had become prime minister of Portugal after the first provisional government resigned. The Party then asserted its complete support for these changes and for the Agrarian Reform process that implemented collectivization of the agricultural sector and the land in a region called the Zone of Intervention of the Agrarian Reform (ZIRA), which included the land south of the Tagus River. The Party took the lead of that process and drove it according to the party's program, organizing many thousands of peasants into cooperatives. That, combined with the party's strong clandestine organization and support of the peasants' movement during the preceding years in that region, made the southern regions of Portugal the major stronghold of the PCP.

One year after the revolution, the first democratic elections took place to elect the parliament that would write a new Constitution to replace the Constitution of 1933. The Party achieved 12.52% of the voting and elected 30 MPs. In the summer of 1975 the revolutionary process reached its climax, and the government of Vasco Gonçalves, influenced by the left, was under attack from the Socialist Party and the right-wing. Several rallies and demonstrations both in support of and against the government were being held. During the summer, several party offices were attacked, pillaged or set on fire. On July 19 a major rally organized by the Socialists against the party was held in Lisbon. In August, nine influential military officers (the Group of 9) issued a document against Vasco Gonçalves and the Movement of the Armed Forces. In the following months the tension continued between the PCP and the moderated parties. In September, Gonçalves was replaced by Pinheiro de Azevedo. The divisions inside the military were growing, and, on November 25, a coup attempt by the radical left was thwarted by the right wing military. In the aftermath, the party was attacked by the remaining forces, but a notable speech by Melo Antunes, a member of the Group of 9, asserted the importance of the PCP inside the Portuguese democratic regime.

In the following months, the attacks against party offices continued with a lower intensity, however. In 1976, the building of the current democratic regime was starting and, on April 2, the new democratic constitution, which included several references to "Socialism" and a "Classless Society", was approved with the party's support. On April 25, the second democratic election was carried out and the party raised its share of the vote to 14.56% and 40 MPs. In June, the first democratic presidential election was held and the party's candidate, Octávio Pato, garnered 7.5% of the votes. The winner of the election was Ramalho Eanes, an officer of the moderate military wing.

In that same year, the first Avante! Festival took place. The festival would become a major political and cultural event in Portugal and is still held yearly, as of 2006. The eighth congress was held in Lisbon from November 11–14. The congress mainly stated the need to continue the quest for Socialism in Portugal and the need to defend the achievements of the Revolution against what the party considered to be a political step backward, led by a coalition of the Socialist Party and the right-wing Centro Democrático Social, who were opposed to the Agrarian Reform process. In December, in the first local election, the party, in coalition with the Portuguese Democratic Movement and the People's Socialist Front, attained 18% of the vote, electing 37 mayors.

Late 1970s and early 1980s

In 1979, the party carried out its ninth congress, which analyzed the state of the post-revolutionary Portugal, right-wing politics and the party's struggles to keep the nationalized economy. In December 1979, an extra legislative election took place after a wave of political turmoil caused the fall of the government. The party formed the United People Alliance, in coalition with the Portuguese Democratic Movement and increased its vote to 18.96% and 47 MPs. The election was won by a right-wing coalition, led by Francisco Sá Carneiro, which immediately started a policy that the party considered to be contrary to working-class interests. In the same year, local elections were held and the party gathered 20.5% of the vote and elected 50 mayors, also as part of the United People Alliance. In November 1979, the Communist Students League merged with the Young Communist League to form the Portuguese Communist Youth, which is still the party's youth organization.

In 1980, a new election was called and the party dropped to 41 seats. Also in 1980, in the presidential election, the party's candidate left the race and supported Ramalho Eanes. In the local elections of 1982 the UPA secured the leadership of 55 municipalities, achieving its best result ever, with 20.7% of the vote.

After the sudden death of Sá Carneiro in an airplane crash in 1980, the political instability returned and the right-wing coalition government disintegrated in 1983. In the subsequent legislative election, the party achieved 44 MPs and 18.20% of the vote as part of the APU in the 1983 elections. The election was won by the Socialists that formed a grand coalition with the Social Democrats. Also in 1983 the party held the tenth congress that again criticized what it saw as the dangers of right-wing politics. In 1985, a new election was called, prompted by the unstable balance of forces inside the grand coalition and Aníbal Cavaco Silva led the Social Democrats to a narrow victory, the party initiated its electoral decline, gathering only 15.5% of the voting.

In 1986, the surprising rise of the socialist Mário Soares, who reached the second round in the presidential election defeating the party's candidate, Salgado Zenha, made the party call an extra Congress. The eleventh congress was called with only two weeks' notice, in order to decide whether or not to support Soares against Freitas do Amaral. Soares was supported, and he won by a slight margin. Had he not been supported by the PCP he would have lost. The Congress was considered a success, despite being prepared with such short notice. In 1987, after the fall of Cavaco Silva's government, another election took place. The Party, now in coalition with the Ecologist Party "The Greens" (PEV) and with the Democratic Intervention (ID), a political association, in the Unitary Democratic Coalition (CDU) saw an electoral decline to 12.18% and 31 MPs. In the election, Cavaco Silva consolidated his power with an absolute majority.

From the end of the Socialist Bloc to the present

From the late 1980s until 1991
In 1988, another congress took place, the twelfth, held in Porto, in which more than 2,000 delegates participated. The congress analyzed the evolution of the political situation in Eastern Europe and also the right wing policies carried out by the government of Aníbal Cavaco Silva. A new set of statutes and a program were put forth, with the new program being titled, "Portugal, an Advanced Democracy for the 21st Century". The program, which is still the party's program (as of 2006), traced five major objectives to the party's struggle: a free democratic regime, based on the citizens' participation, an economic development based on a mixed economy at the service of the people, a social policy capable of assuring the rise of the country's living standards, culture available to everyone, and an independent and sovereign Portugal, pursuing peaceful relations with all countries and peoples.

At the end of the 1980s, the Socialist Bloc of Eastern Europe started to disintegrate and the Party faced new challenges. With many members leaving, the Party called an extra congress for May 1990, in Loures. There, the majority of the more than 2,000 delegates decided to continue the Party's "revolutionary way to Socialism", clashing with what many other communist parties around the world were doing, by keeping its Marxist-Leninist guidelines. The congress asserted that socialism in the Soviet Union had failed, but a unique historical experience, several social changes and several achievements by the labour movement had been influenced by the Socialist Bloc. Álvaro Cunhal was re-elected General Secretary and Carlos Carvalhas was elected Assistant General Secretary.

From the 13th Congress to the present
In the legislative election of 1991, the Party won 8.84% of the national vote and 17 MPs, continuing its electoral decline. The Party's candidate to the presidential election of the same year, Carlos Carvalhas, finished 3rd, after gathering 12.5% of the votes.

The fourteenth congress took place in 1992 and Carlos Carvalhas was elected the new General Secretary, replacing Álvaro Cunhal. The Congress analyzed the whole new international situation created by the disappearance of the Soviet Union and the defeat of Socialism in Eastern Europe. The Party also outlined measures intended to put Aníbal Cavaco Silva and the right-wing government on its way out, which occurred shortly thereafter. In 1995 the right-wing Social Democratic Party was replaced in the government by the Socialist Party after the October legislative election, in which the Party received 8.61% of the votes. Meanwhile, in the European election of 1994, the Party elected 3 MEPs, gathering 11.2% of the voting.

In December 1996, the fifteenth congress was held, this time in Porto, with more than 1,600 delegates participating. The congress criticized the right-wing policies of the Socialist government of António Guterres and also debated the future of the Party following the debacle of the Socialist Bloc. During the first government of Guterres, the first referendum to the abortion law was held in Portugal. Despite a massive campaign from the Party and the remaining leftwing forces, the liberalization of abortion was rejected by the voters.

In the subsequent local elections, the Party continued to decline, but in the legislative election of 1999 the Party increased its voting percentage for the first time in many years. The sixteenth congress was held in December 2000 and Carlos Carvalhas was re-elected General Secretary. In the legislative election of 2002, held after the resignation of the socialist Prime-Minister António Guterres, the Party achieved its lowest voting result ever, with only 7.0% of the votes. The right-wing returned to power with a coalition between the Social Democratic Party and the People's Party. The new government introduced several changes in the labour laws that triggered the first general strike in many years, in November 2002. With the strong support of the Party and of the CGTP, hundreds of thousands of workers participated in the strike.

In the following European election of 2004, the CDU managed to keep its two MEPs, after claiming 9.1% of the vote. The two members of the European Parliament, Ilda Figueiredo and Pedro Guerreiro sit in the European United Left - Nordic Green Left group.

The most recent Congress, the seventeenth, in November 2004, elected Jerónimo de Sousa, a former metallurgical worker, as the new General Secretary and analyzed the political situation since the last congress in 2000. It also reaffirmed the program adopted in the 12th Congress. Minor changes in the statutes, such as considering the official website as the Party's official press or adapting the voting methods to the new laws that made voting by showing hands illegal, were also introduced. In January 2005, the right-wing majority in the parliament was dissolved and a new legislative election was held. The Party raised its share of the vote and is now represented in the parliament by 12 MPs of 230, after receiving about 430,000 votes.

Álvaro Cunhal died on 13 June 2005 after being away from the public eye for several years. Two days later, 250,000 people gathered in Lisbon to attend to his funeral, one of the largest funerals in Portuguese history.

After the last local election, in 2021, in which the Party lost the presidency of 5 municipalities, the Portuguese Communist Party holds the leadership of 18 (of 308) municipalities, most of them in Alentejo and Setúbal, and has leadership of hundreds of civil parishes, and local assembly members. The local administration of the PCP often concerns itself with issues such as preventing privatization of the water supply, funding culture and education, providing access to sports and promoting health, facilitating participatory democracy and preventing corruption. The presence of the Greens in the coalition also keeps an eye on environmental issues such as recycling and water treatment.

The Party's work still follows the program set forth by "Advanced Democracy for the 21st Century". Issues like the decriminalization of abortion, workers rights, the increasing fees for the Health Service and Education, the erosion of the social safety net, low salaries and pensions, imperialism and war, and solidarity with other countries such as Iraq, Afghanistan, Palestine, Cuba, and the Basque Country are constant concerns in the Party's agenda.

From the election of 2015 until the failure to pass the government budget in 2021, the Party supported the government of António Costa together with the Left Bloc. In the elections of 2022 the Socialist Party won an absolute majority and the PCP and Left Bloc returned to opposition.

See also
Communist Party of Portugal (in Construction)
Portuguese Communist Party
Electoral results of the Portuguese Communist Party
History of Portugal
Carnation Revolution
Catarina Eufémia

References

Bibliography

External links
In Portuguese:
Portuguese Communist Party official web site
History section of the Party's official website
Avante Festival! official website
Avante! newspaper online edition
PCP's short biography by the Carnation Revolution archive center

In English:
Portuguese Communist Party web site
Portuguese Communist Party program

Political history of Portugal
Portuguese Communist Party
History of socialism
Portuguese Communist Party
History of organisations based in Portugal